Kylertown is a census-designated place (CDP) in Graham and Cooper townships, Clearfield County, in the U.S. state of Pennsylvania. As of the 2020 census, the population was 336.

It is located on Pennsylvania Route 53 at Exit 133 of Interstate 80.

Demographics

References

Census-designated places in Clearfield County, Pennsylvania
Census-designated places in Pennsylvania